Al-Saadah is a coastal town 30–40 km from Salalah in southern Oman. There are a few supermarkets, shops, schools and colleges in the town, as well as a police station and a healthcare centre run by the Ministry of Health. Saadha is linked to the nearby towns of Taqa, Mirbat, and Thumrait by motorable roads.

History
In 1908, J.G. Lorimer recorded Sadah in his Gazetteer of the Persian Gulf, noting its location as being on the coast east
of Mirbat, roughly 20 miles or more from that place by land. He wrote:

References

Populated places in Oman